Ali Mohammad Shahbaz, (Urdu: علی محمّد شہباز) (born Ali Mohammad Qureshi, 1939 – 1996) known by his pen name Shahbaz was a Kashmiri revolutionary poet, satirist, humanist, philanthropist, calligrapher, and teacher. His literary work pictured and voiced the agony of Kashmir conflict.

One of his famous poem is:

Translation:

Early life
Born on 1 May 1939 at his ancestral resident Mawer (Langate), a village in Handwara town of North Kashmir's Kupwara district. He had his primary school education from Islamia Model School, Qalamabad and completed high school at Handwara. He has done masters in the Kashmiri language.

Personal life
Shahbaz was a teacher by profession and was appointed as the Principal of Govt. Higher Secondary School Handwara until his death. His father, Gh Mohammad Quershi was a cleric, who died when Shahbaz was in teens. Shahbaz turned to poetry at a very tender age. He was tremendously influenced by his teacher Shahlal Bahar. Bahar was the Vice President of Adbee Markaz Kamraz, member cultural academy Srinagar and Sahitiyah Academy, New Delhi.

His poetry in music field
Well known Kashmiri singers have sung most of Shahbaz's gazals and one of the most famous among them, the one that is broadcast on Radio Kashmir almost every morning:

His poetry have been sung at national level by singer Noor Mohammad titled "Janaan" (11 November 2020) and "Baliye" (9 April 2021) which have been released by Zee Music Company at the Online Video Platform YouTube.

Death
Shahbaz was shot dead by an unidentified gunmen on 4 July 1996 at his native village Shathgund Langate. He was paid tribute by Hisbul Mujahideen quoting that He has been killed in custody.

Bibliography
 Ali Mohammad Shahbaz (Monograph on the Kashmiri Poet), Enayat Gul

References

Kashmiri poets
Indian people
Indian male poets
Kashmiri Muslims
People from Kupwara district
Poets from Jammu and Kashmir
19th-century poets
19th-century Indian male writers
1996 deaths
1939 births
Writers from Jammu and Kashmir